Nador (Riffian-Berber: ⵏⴰⴷⵓⵔ) is a coastal city and provincial capital in the northeastern Rif region of Morocco with a population of about 161,726 (2014 census).

Nador was founded in the 19th century by local Berber tribes and was under Spanish occupation from 1912 until Morocco's independence in 1956.

The Nador Province has over 600,000 inhabitants, predominantly of Rif-Berber ethnicity. Nador is considered the second largest city in the Oriental East after Wejda.

Etymology 
The city name originated from the local Amazigh tribes of Has Nador, which was a small village near the Nador lagoon.

Overview 

The economy of Nador and Nador province includes fishery, agriculture, some light and heavy industry.

In the summer months of June to August thousands of people originating from the Nador area and living in Europe return to the city. The total of these annual visitors may exceed 250,000. They mainly stay with relatives or in rented or owned apartments, rather than staying in Nador's hotels.

The location of the city on the Mediterranean coast and proximity of the Spanish town Melilla mean there is significant international trade, particularly evident in the widespread sale of Spanish manufactured foodstuffs and household goods in Nador.

Nador was infamous as a centre of smuggling cheap Spanish and Chinese duty-free goods. Currently the smuggling has declined but it still alive competing with a smuggling stream from Algeria. Many used consumer goods from Europe and China find their way to Morocco and Africa via Melilla and Nador, both legally and illegally. The goods range from conserved food, clothes, shoes, electric home appliances, up to sophisticated hardware.

Demographics 

It has recently become a fast-growing city, despite experiencing a population drop with the departure of the Spanish, when the population decreased from 23,000 in the early 1950s to less than 5,000 in 1960. Nador's population grew by 566% between 1960 and 1971, from 4,806 people in 1960 and 32,000 in 1971. Its population has since grown with over 500% once again, to a total estimated population of 200,000 in 2015. Only eight years previously, in 2007, the city had a population of 120,000. 98 percent of the city-population is made up by Riffian-Berbers. The Amazigh culture is dominant and Nador is the largest Tarifit-speaking (one of the Tamazight languages) city in the world. The population density in the city of Nador is many times that of the larger Nador Province.

Geography 

Nador is the 19th largest city in Morocco and is the capital of Nador Province in the Oriental Region of northern Morocco. It is located on the Sebkha Bou Areq lagoon on the Mediterranean coastline. The city sprawls along the coast. The city center of Nador is largely a grid of streets around the north-south axis of Avenue Hassan II, with the main bus- and taxi stations at its southern end. Avenue Mohammed V runs from the city's waterfront to the city's governmental facilities and town hall on its east end. Mohammed V Boulevard has open plazas and Spanish Iberian-style architecture, particularly seen in the Roman Catholic churches. The administrative city center, main post office, and the Grand Mosque are all located on the Youssef Ben Tachfine Boulevard.

Nature 
The salt lagoon off and to the east of the city attract wildlife, especially migratory birds The protected wetlands at Oued Moulouya and Kariat Arekman by the Moulouya River mouth are home to greater pink flamingos, great crested grebes, avocets, black-winged stilts, coots, dunlins, oystercatchers, Audouin's gulls, grey herons, little egrets, spotted redshanks, black-tailed godwits, common redshanks, kingfishers, black terns, and numerous other species of terns and gulls. As well as being a safe haven for birds, this area is frequently visited by locals because of its natural environment. There are major freshwater and saline sites covering large areas of protected sand dunes, marsh- and swampland. Insects include damselflies, Caelifera, and numerous others. The flora includes marram grass, juniper, Cistus, and more.

Climate
Nador has a hot semi-arid climate (Köppen climate classification BSh). In winter there is more rainfall than in summer. About  of precipitation falls annually.

Neighborhoods 

Main Nador city quarters and neighbourhoods include:
 Teraqqa'a (حي ترقاع)
 El Khettabi (الخطابي)
 El Kindy (الكندي)
 Laarasi (Laɛraṣi)
 Anafag / Elmatar / New Nador / Ennaḍur Amaynu (الناظور الجديد)
 Laari Shikh (Laɛri n Eccix)
 Ammas n Temdint / Centro / Centre ville (Downtown Nador)
Downtown Nador: a relatively developed area in comparison with the rest of the city. This lies in the centre of the city and was partially developed during the Spanish occupation of northern Morocco.

 Ulad Mimun (Ayt Mimun)
 Isebbanen
 Ichumay (Icumay)
 Aarrid (Ɛarriḍ)
 Ulad Barhim
 Tireqqaâ / Tireqqaɛ
 Ayt Leḥsen
 Erfid / Ibarraqen

Nador transmitter

Near Nador is the transmission site for long- and short-wave Medi 1 Radio which broadcasts to all Maghreb countries.

Transport 

A railway linking Nador to Taourirt was opened on 2 July 2009 by king Mohammed VI of Morocco. as part of ONCF's rail projects. Previously, there was a connecting bus link from Taourirt, also operated by railway company ONCF

In addition, several direct bus links operate between Nador and major Moroccan cities. Daily ferry services link Nador Port with Almeria in Spain and a weekly service to Sète in France.

Nador International Airport offers direct flights to Moroccan and European destinations, such as cities in France and Germany, and acts as a second airport for travellers to and from Melilla.

Roads give access to the Fes-Oujda expressway and to nearby Melilla.

Economy 

The main two economic industries here are fishing and agriculture. Other types of industrial income are generated from textiles, chemicals, and numerous metallurgical industries. Recently, tourism has also become an important factor for the economy.

Most tourists come from other Moroccan cities, but Nador has also an increasing number of European visitors, some through the international ferry connections to Spain and France. Nador International Airport, in which opened in 1999, also serves numerous European cities, including flights to Amsterdam, Brussels, Frankfurt, Marseille, and Barcelona. The two Nador railway stations connect to the rail network of the country of Morocco. The recent boost in tourism here has inspired ambitious tourism plans for the area, endorsed by King Mohammed VI. With its avenues, palm-lined boulevards and brand new marina, hotels, cafés, banks, shops and restaurants press on to make it suitable for the fast-growing tourism industry.

Nador has experienced a dramatic economic growth in recent years, fueled by traditional industries, such as metallurgy, and by modern ones, i.e. electronics, chemicals, and textiles. Older industries as fishing and agriculture are still the most important income for Nadoris. Beni Enzar, on the edge of Nador, is home to Nador Port, which is one of the most crucial fishing ports on the Mediterranean coast. Nador Port also has modern naval dockyards. Nador's farm land is extremely fertile, and the main agricultural resources are fruits, citrus, and wine-grapes.

Tourism 

During the summer months, Nador is visited by hundreds of thousands of Moroccan migrants living in Europe, who are originally from the province or from the city of Nador itself. These summer visitors contribute strongly to the development of the city.

Until early 2008 the city end of the boulevard was formed by the Rif Hotel, but in the spring of 2008 the existing hotel was demolished and the road alongside the boulevard opened and extended. This new road by-passes the city centre and runs directly towards the main roundabout at the entrance of Nador via the road to Tawima. The remaining grounds where the hotel and its facilities were located are being redeveloped into a new hotel complex: after some delay the new development is being built under supervision of Khalid El Adouli. The new Rif complex is being built on the grounds of the former hotel minus the strip of land directly on the coast, as this is now a road and a public boulevard on reclaimed land.

The new hotel will target the high-end tourism market and also cater for business users with congress-facilities. Once re-opened it will offer a discothèque (serving alcoholic beverages) and meeting or party rooms. The hotel itself will offer 110 four-star rooms, including ten suites and also 76 apartment rooms. The budget for the redevelopment of the hotel is 356 million dirham and the total usable floorspace will be .

Just outside Nador a new ecological resort, Abdouna Trifa, is being developed, including holiday homes, a golf course and a marina. This ten-year development plan was started in 2008 by Mohammed VI, the king of Morocco. Both this project as well as the new RIF Hotel are being developed by Compagnie Générale Immobiliere (CGI), part of the CDG Group. When completed, the resort will consist of approx. 1700 "villas", 1300 apartments, a four-star and a five-star hotel. The development also includes a 27-hole golf-track and several other tourist facilities.

Notable people 

Achraf Ouchen - professional karateka
Najat Vallaud-Belkacem - politician 
Elwalid Mimoun - artist
Khalid izri - artist
Namika - musician
Jamal Benomar - politician
Ahmed Aboutaleb - politician
Selim Amallah - football player

References

 
Mediterranean port cities and towns in Morocco
Populated places in Nador Province
Municipalities of Morocco
Rif
Provincial capitals in Morocco
Berber populated places